Moers is a surname. Notable people with the surname include: 

Bobby Moers (1918–1986), American college basketball, baseball, and football player
Ellen Moers (1928–1978), American academic and literary scholar
Tobias Moers (born 1966), German businessman
Walter Moers (born 1957), German comic creator and author